This page lists all described species of the spider family Trechaleidae accepted by the World Spider Catalog :

A

Amapalea

Amapalea Silva & Lise, 2006
 A. brasiliana Silva & Lise, 2006 (type) — Brazil

B

Barrisca

Barrisca Chamberlin & Ivie, 1936
 B. kochalkai Platnick, 1978 — Colombia, Venezuela
 B. nannella Chamberlin & Ivie, 1936 (type) — Panama, Colombia, Peru

C

Caricelea

Caricelea Silva & Lise, 2007
 C. apurimac Silva & Lise, 2009 — Peru
 C. camisea Silva & Lise, 2009 — Peru
 C. wayrapata Silva & Lise, 2007 (type) — Peru

Cupiennius

Cupiennius Simon, 1891
 C. bimaculatus (Taczanowski, 1874) — Colombia, Venezuela, Brazil, Guyana, Ecuador
 C. chiapanensis Medina, 2006 — Mexico
 C. coccineus F. O. Pickard-Cambridge, 1901 — Costa Rica to Colombia
 C. cubae Strand, 1909 — Cuba, Costa Rica to Venezuela
 C. foliatus F. O. Pickard-Cambridge, 1901 — Costa Rica, Panama
 C. getazi Simon, 1891 (type) — Costa Rica, Panama
 C. granadensis (Keyserling, 1877) — Costa Rica to Colombia
 C. remedius Barth & Cordes, 1998 — Guatemala
 C. salei (Keyserling, 1877) — Mexico, Central America, Hispaniola
 C. valentinei (Petrunkevitch, 1925) — Panama
 C. vodou Brescovit & Polotow, 2005 — Hispaniola

D

Dossenus

Dossenus Simon, 1898
 D. guapore Silva, Lise & Carico, 2007 — Panama, Colombia, Brazil
 D. marginatus Simon, 1898 (type) — Trinidad, Colombia, Peru, Brazil
 D. paraensis Silva & Lise, 2011 — Brazil

Dyrines

Dyrines Simon, 1903
 D. brescoviti Silva & Lise, 2010 — Brazil
 D. ducke Carico & Silva, 2008 — Brazil
 D. huanuco Carico & Silva, 2008 — Peru
 D. striatipes (Simon, 1898) (type) — Panama, Venezuela, Guyana

E

Enna

Enna O. Pickard-Cambridge, 1897
 E. baeza Silva, Lise & Carico, 2008 — Ecuador, Peru
 E. bartica Silva, Lise & Carico, 2008 — Brazil, Guyana
 E. bonaldoi Silva, Lise & Carico, 2008 — Peru, Brazil
 E. caliensis Silva, Lise & Carico, 2008 — Colombia, Bolivia
 E. caparao Silva & Lise, 2009 — Brazil
 E. caricoi Silva & Lise, 2011 — Colombia
 E. carinata Silva & Lise, 2011 — Panama
 E. chickeringi Silva, Lise & Carico, 2008 — Honduras, Costa Rica
 E. colonche Silva, Lise & Carico, 2008 — Ecuador
 E. eberhardi Silva, Lise & Carico, 2008 — Costa Rica, Panama
 E. echarate Silva & Lise, 2009 — Peru
 E. estebanensis (Simon, 1898) — Venezuela, Ecuador
 E. frijoles Silva & Lise, 2011 — Panama
 E. gloriae Rengifo, Albo & Delgado-Santa, 2021 — Colombia
 E. hara Silva, Lise & Carico, 2008 — Peru
 E. huanuco Silva, Lise & Carico, 2008 — Peru
 E. igarape Silva, Lise & Carico, 2008 — Peru, Brazil
 E. jullieni (Simon, 1898) — Panama, Colombia, Venezuela
 E. junin (Carico & Silva, 2010) — Peru
 E. kuyuwiniensis Silva, Lise & Carico, 2008 — Guyana
 E. maya Silva, Lise & Carico, 2008 — Honduras, Costa Rica, Peru
 E. meridionalis Silva & Lise, 2009 — Brazil
 E. minor Petrunkevitch, 1925 — Panama, Colombia
 E. moyobamba Silva, Víquez & Lise, 2012 — Peru
 E. nesiotes Chamberlin, 1925 — Panama
 E. osaensis Silva, Víquez & Lise, 2012 — Costa Rica
 E. paraensis Silva, Lise & Carico, 2008 — Brazil
 E. pecki Silva, Lise & Carico, 2008 — Costa Rica
 E. redundans (Platnick, 1993) — Brazil
 E. rioja Silva, 2013 — Peru
 E. riotopo Silva, Lise & Carico, 2008 — Ecuador
 E. rothi Silva, Lise & Carico, 2008 — Ecuador
 E. segredo Silva & Lise, 2009 — Brazil
 E. silvae Silva & Lise, 2011 — Peru
 E. triste Silva & Lise, 2011 — Venezuela
 E. trivittata Silva & Lise, 2009 — Peru, Brazil
 E. velox O. Pickard-Cambridge, 1897 (type) — Mexico
 E. venezuelana Silva & Lise, 2011 — Venezuela
 E. xingu Carico & Silva, 2010 — Brazil
 E. zurqui Silva & Lise, 2011 — Costa Rica

† Eotrechalea

† Eotrechalea Wunderlich, 2004 - †Eotrechaleinae
 † E. annulata Wunderlich, 2004

† Esuritor

† Esuritor Petrunkevitch, 1942 - †Eotrechaleinae
 † E. aculeatus Petrunkevitch, 1958 
 † E. spinipes Petrunkevitch, 1942

H

Heidrunea

Heidrunea Brescovit & Höfer, 1994
 H. arijana Brescovit & Höfer, 1994 — Brazil
 H. irmleri Brescovit & Höfer, 1994 (type) — Brazil
 H. lobrita Brescovit & Höfer, 1994 — Brazil

Hesydrus

Hesydrus Simon, 1898
 H. aurantius (Mello-Leitão, 1942) — Colombia, Peru, Bolivia
 H. canar Carico, 2005 — Colombia, Ecuador, Peru
 H. caripito Carico, 2005 — Colombia, Venezuela, Peru
 H. chanchamayo Carico, 2005 — Peru
 H. habilis (O. Pickard-Cambridge, 1896) — Guatemala, Costa Rica, Panama
 H. palustris Simon, 1898 (type) — Columbia, Ecuador, Peru, Bolivia
 H. yacuiba Carico, 2005 — Bolivia

L

† Linoptes

† Linoptes Menge, 1854 - †Eotrechaleinae
 † L. oculeus Menge, 1854 
 † L. valdespinosa Petrunkevitch, 1958

N

Neoctenus

Neoctenus Simon, 1897
 N. comosus Simon, 1897 (type) — Brazil
 N. eximius Mello-Leitão, 1938 — Brazil
 N. finneganae Mello-Leitão, 1948 — Guyana
 N. peruvianus (Chamberlin, 1916) — Peru

P

Paradossenus

Paradossenus F. O. Pickard-Cambridge, 1903
 P. acanthocymbium Carico & Silva, 2010 — Brazil
 P. benicito Carico & Silva, 2010 — Bolivia, Brazil
 P. caricoi Sierwald, 1993 — Colombia, Guyana
 P. corumba Brescovit & Raizer, 2000 — Brazil, Paraguay
 P. isthmus Carico & Silva, 2010 — Nicaragua to Colombia
 P. longipes (Taczanowski, 1874) (type) — Venezuela to Argentina
 P. makuxi Silva & Lise, 2011 — Brazil
 P. minimus (Mello-Leitão, 1940) — Brazil
 P. pozo Carico & Silva, 2010 — Colombia, Venezuela, Brazil
 P. pulcher Sierwald, 1993 — Venezuela, Ecuador, Brazil
 P. sabana Carico & Silva, 2010 — Venezuela
 P. santaremensis (Silva & Lise, 2006) — Brazil
 P. tocantins Carico & Silva, 2010 — Brazil

Paratrechalea

Paratrechalea Carico, 2005
 P. azul Carico, 2005 — Brazil
 P. galianoae Carico, 2005 — Brazil, Argentina
 P. julyae Silva & Lise, 2006 — Brazil
 P. longigaster Carico, 2005 — Brazil, Argentina
 P. ornata (Mello-Leitão, 1943) (type) — Brazil, Uruguay, Argentina
 P. saopaulo Carico, 2005 — Brazil
 P. wygodzinskyi (Soares & Camargo, 1948) — Brazil

R

Rhoicinus

Rhoicinus Simon, 1898
 R. andinus Exline, 1960 — Peru
 R. fuscus (Caporiacco, 1947) — Guyana
 R. gaujoni Simon, 1898 (type) — Ecuador, Brazil
 R. lugato Höfer & Brescovit, 1994 — Brazil
 R. rothi Exline, 1960 — Peru
 R. schlingeri Exline, 1960 — Peru
 R. urucu Brescovit & Oliveira, 1994 — Brazil
 R. wallsi Exline, 1950 — Ecuador
 R. wapleri Simon, 1898 — Venezuela
 R. weyrauchi Exline, 1960 — Peru

S

Shinobius

Shinobius Yaginuma, 1991
 S. orientalis (Yaginuma, 1967) (type) — Japan

Syntrechalea

Syntrechalea F. O. Pickard-Cambridge, 1902
 S. adis Carico, 2008 — Venezuela, Brazil, Surinam, Peru
 S. boliviensis (Carico, 1993) — Colombia, Peru, Bolivia, Brazil
 S. brasilia Carico, 2008 — Brazil
 S. caballero Carico, 2008 — Brazil, Paraguay
 S. caporiacco Carico, 2008 — Venezuela, Brazil, Guyana, Peru
 S. lomalinda (Carico, 1993) — Colombia, Venezuela, Brazil
 S. napoensis Carico, 2008 — Ecuador, Brazil
 S. neblina Silva & Lise, 2010 — Brazil
 S. reimoseri (Caporiacco, 1947) — Brazil, Guyana, Ecuador, Peru
 S. robusta Silva & Lise, 2010 — Brazil
 S. syntrechaloides (Mello-Leitão, 1941) — Colombia, Venezuela, Brazil, Guyana, Peru, Bolivia
 S. tenuis F. O. Pickard-Cambridge, 1902 (type) — Mexico to Brazil

T

Trechalea

Trechalea Thorell, 1869
 T. amazonica F. O. Pickard-Cambridge, 1903 — Trinidad, Colombia, Brazil
 T. bucculenta (Simon, 1898) — Colombia, Brazil, Argentina, Bolivia
 T. connexa (O. Pickard-Cambridge, 1898) — Mexico
 T. extensa (O. Pickard-Cambridge, 1896) — Mexico to Panama
 T. gertschi Carico & Minch, 1981 — USA, Mexico
 T. longitarsis (C. L. Koch, 1847) (type) — Colombia, Ecuador, Peru
 T. macconnelli Pocock, 1900 — Ecuador, Peru, Brazil, Guyana, Suriname
 T. paucispina Caporiacco, 1947 — Peru, Brazil, Guyana
 T. tirimbina Silva & Lapinski, 2012 — Costa Rica

Trechaleoides

Trechaleoides Carico, 2005
 T. biocellata (Mello-Leitão, 1926) — Brazil, Paraguay, Argentina
 T. keyserlingi (F. O. Pickard-Cambridge, 1903) (type) — Brazil, Paraguay, Uruguay, Argentina

References

Trechaleidae